De pocas, pocas pulgas is a Mexican telenovela for children, produced by Mapat L. de Zatarain for Televisa in 2003. It is an adaptation of the 1992 telenovela El abuelo y yo.

It stars Joana Benedek, Gerardo Murguía, Ignacio López Tarso, Santiago Mirabent, Natasha Dupeyrón and antagonistic involvement of Alejandro Ávila as one of the main villains of the story.

Plot
Danilo is a boy with a positive attitude and an inner strength that nothing in the world can break. He has to work hard to buy food for himself and his dog Tomás, who is his best friend. Danilo looks forward to his mother coming back one day. Due to the circumstances, he will meet an old man, Don Julián, and they will unite the joy of childhood with the wisdom of age. In addition, Danilo will meet a rich girl, Alejandra, with a totally different life from his. However, her affection is so great that they become best friends, despite the difference in social class.

Cast 

 Ignacio López Tarso as Don Julián Montes
 Santiago Mirabent as Danilo Fernández 
 Natasha Dupeyrón as Alejandra "Alex" Lastra
 Gerardo Murguía as Alonso Lastra
 Joana Benedek as Reneé de Lastra 
 Arleth Terán as Mireya Garníca 
 René Strickler as Adrián 
 Alejandro Ávila as Lorenzo Valverde
 Rocío Sobrado as Genoveva de Valverde 
 Nancy Patiño as Genoveva "La Beba" Valverde
 Joseph Sasson as Maximiliano Alanis Valverde 
 María Victoria as Inés  
 Sergio Corona as Benito
 Gabriel de Cervantes as Victoriano Vázquez
 Imanol Landeta as Rolando  
 Danna Paola as Annie
 Vadhir Derbez as Odilon "Chorizo" 
 Carlos Miguel Szavozd as Ramon "Jamón"
 Alex Perea as Perico
 Yurem Rojas as Antonio "Toño"
 Cristiane Aguinaga as Ximena
 Óscar Eugenio as Tobías 
 Agustín Arana as Claudio Zapata
 Juan Ignacio Aranda as Julián Montes 
 Diego Barquinero as Payasito
 Joana Brito as Lola
 Julio Camejo as Noel
 Rubén Cerda as Bruno
 Ricardo Crespo as Guillermo "Memo"
 Florencia Cuenca as Carmela
 Ricardo de Pascual as Don Octavio Guerra
 Luis Fernando Madriz as Gabriel "Gabo"
 Maribel Fernández as Gladys
 Sergio Jiménez as El Viudo
 Fabián Lavalle as Fabián
 Aurora Molina as Madre Socorro
 Patricia Reyes Spíndola as Griselda 
 Lourdes Reyes as Rocío Montes de Fernández
 Patricia Romero as Leonora
 Julio Vega as Don Lupe 
 Mickey Santana as Gastón
 Francisco Naal as Gabriel
 Kelchie Arizmendi as Cristina

Awards and nominations

References

External links 
 

2003 telenovelas
Mexican telenovelas
2003 Mexican television series debuts
2003 Mexican television series endings
Spanish-language telenovelas
Televisa telenovelas
Children's telenovelas
Television series about children